Chen Guoling (born June 1947) is a retired general of the Chinese People's Liberation Army (PLA). He served as political commissar of the Nanjing Military Region.

Biography
Chen was born in Zhuanghe, Liaoning, and joined the PLA in 1968. He was promoted to the position of political commissar of the Nanjing Military Region in 2007. He attained his present rank of lieutenant general in July 2006. He is an influential theoretician in the PLA. He has published article in the PLA Daily, supporting the study and practice of the Three Represents concept in the military. He was promoted to General on 19 July 2010. He was a member of the 17th Central Committee of the Communist Party of China.

References

Citations

Sources 

  Biography of Chen Guoling, Phoenix Television, 2007-07-05.

Living people
1947 births
People from Dalian
People's Liberation Army generals from Liaoning
Political commissars of the Nanjing Military Region
Political commissars of the People's Liberation Army